The men's ISSF 50 meter pistol (then known as free pistol) was one of the thirteen shooting events at the 1992 Summer Olympics. There were 44 competitors from 29 nations. Nations had been limited to two shooters each since the 1952 Games. The competition was held on 26 July 1992 at the Mollet del Vallès shooting range.

Kanstantsin Lukashyk, a 16-year-old Belarusian, unexpectedly had the pre-final lead. The final became severely interrupted by a pistol malfunction, originally assumed to be a technical fault in the electronic target system, for Tanyu Kiryakov who was second but had to leave the competition short of finishing his ten shots. Lukashyk needed a nine for his last shot, and it broke only seconds before the 75-second deadline, but was a nine indeed, and so the sensation was a fact. Wang Yifu won the silver medal and Ragnar Skanåker, 42 years older than the gold medalist, came third, winning his fourth Olympic medal in this event. Skanåker was the first of two men to win four medals in the event, with Jin Jong-oh accomplishing the feat from 2004 to 2016. Wang was the eighth man to win two medals in the event.

Background
This was the 18th appearance of the ISSF 50 meter pistol event. The event was held at every Summer Olympics from 1896 to 1920 (except 1904, when no shooting events were held) and from 1936 to 2016; it was nominally open to women from 1968 to 1980, although very few women participated these years. A separate women's event would be introduced in 1984. 1896 and 1908 were the only Games in which the distance was not 50 metres; the former used 30 metres and the latter 50 yards.

Five of the eight finalists from the 1988 Games returned: gold medalist Sorin Babii of Romania, silver medalist Ragnar Skanåker of Sweden, fourth-place finisher Tanyu Kiryakov of Bulgaria, fifth-place finisher Gernot Eder of East Germany, and eighth-place finisher Wang Yifu of China. Skanåker was a long-time Olympic competitor, having won gold in the event 20 years earlier, placing in the top 10 in both 1976 and 1980, and then taking silver in 1984 and 1988. Wang had been one of the first Chinese medalists, earning bronze in 1984. The 1990 world championship podium had been Spas Koprinkov of Bulgaria, Wang, and Sergei Pyzhianov of the Unified Team (who had won in 1986), all of whom were competing in Barcelona.

Iraq made its debut in the event; twelve former Soviet republics competed together as the Unified Team. Sweden and the United States each made their 16th appearance, tied for most of any nation.

Lukashyk used a Tula TOZ 35.

Competition format
The competition featured two rounds, adding a final to the event. The qualifying round was the same as the previous competitions: each shooter fired 60 shots, in 6 series of 10 shots each, at a distance of 50 metres. The target was round, 50 centimetres in diameter, with 10 scoring rings. Scoring for each shot was up to 10 points, in increments of 1 point. The maximum score possible was 600 points. The top 8 shooters advanced to a final. They shot an additional series of 10 shots, with the score added to their qualifying round score to give a 70-shot total. Ties were broken first by final round score. Any pistol was permitted.

Records
Prior to this competition, the existing world and Olympic records were as follows.

No new world or Olympic records were set during the competition.

Schedule

Results

Qualifying

Final
Kiryakov had been tied with Lukashyk for the lead going into the final, but scored only 51 points on his first six shots. He slammed his pistol down in frustration, bending his sight, and then abandoned the rest of the competition.

With one shot left for Lukashyk, Wang, and Skanåker, the Belarusian had 649 points to the Chinese and Swedish shooters' 648. Wang would win any tie-breaker among the three, and Lukashyk would lose any tie-breaker. All three shot a 9 for their final shot. This kept Lukashyk at the top for the gold medal; Wang and Skanåker tied, with Wang receiving the silver based on the final round tie-breaker.

References

Sources

Shooting at the 1992 Summer Olympics
Men's 1992
Men's events at the 1992 Summer Olympics